Fernando de Acuña y de Herrera (died 1495) was Viceroy of Sicily for 1489–1495.

Family
Ferndando was one of six siblings, a son of an originally Portuguese family, whose grandfather, Lope Vázquez de Acuña I had settled in Spain for political trouble reasons. His father was  Pedro de Acuña y Carrillo de Albornoz, Sieur of Buendía and Azañól since 1397, the Sieur of Dueñas since 9 December 1439, promoted to Count of Buendía in 1475.

Fernando de Acuña y de Herrera Spanish grandmother Teresa, came from a significant Burgos family, named "Carrillo" and a still more powerful family from Cuenca named "de Albornoz". She was the Lady of Paredes, Portilla and Valtablado. All her brothers/sisters became quite powerful also, for instance, her brother Archbishop Alonso Carrillo de Albornoz, a.k.a. Alonso Carrillo de Acuña, (1410–1482), Bishop of Siguenza, Member of the Royal Council under king Juan II of Castile, Enrique IV of Castile and the Royal Couple Isabel I of Castile and Ferdinand II of Aragon, Archbishop of Toledo and one of the more troublesome and intrigant political animals of 15th-century Spanish politics.

Fernando's mother was Inés de Herrera y de Ayala, a daughter of Pedro García de Herrera, a Marshal of Castile, Sieur of Ampudia, related to Conquerors of the Canary Islands. Although he married María Dávila, founding both the Monastery of "Las Gordillas" in Avila, there was no issue through this marriage.

Fernando's eldest brother, II Count of Buendía,  was named however Lope Vázquez de Acuña II, 1st duke of Huete since 24 December 1474, a Knight of the Military Order of Santiago, who died on 1 January 1489, married Inés Enriquez de Quiñones, some of their descendants being crushed through their military interventions in 1521 against king Charles I of Spain, a.k.a. Holy Roman Emperor Charles V.

Fernando's and Lope sister Leonor de Acuña, deceased towards the end of 1501,  married and got succession from  Pedro Manrique de Lara, 2nd count of Paredes de Nava, the eldest brother of famous poet, no issue, Jorge Manrique, deceased in a feudal battle, April 1479. Both Leonor and eldest brother Lope, a Count and also  a Duke, lived and enjoyed the magnificent castle of Segura de la Sierra, province of Jaen, now in the 2100 km2. National Park of Cazorla, Segura y las Villas, as did the 1st and the 2nd Counts of Paredes de Nava, father Rodrigo and brother Pedro respectively of another Knight of the Military Order of Santiago, Spanish Poet Jorge Manrique, killed in a feudal fight on 24 April 1479.

Viceroy
Between 1489 and 1495 he was sent as a viceroy to the kingdom of Sicily, where he died, being buried in the cathedral of Catania. After Fernando's death, the next Viceroy was Aragonese Juan de Lanuza y Pimentel between 1495 - 1507.

References

External links
Abcgenealogia.com
Abcgenealogia.com 
Codigospostal.org
The Restoration of the Castle of Segura de la Sierra - Google docs
 Users.ipfw.edu
Cerespain.com
Users.ipfw.edu
Answers.com

1495 deaths
Viceroys of Sicily
15th-century people from the Kingdom of Aragon
Year of birth unknown